The  is an ancient Spanish breed of warren hound used to hunt small game in Andalusia, Spain. It is one of four podenco breeds recognized by the Real Sociedad Canina de España. It is an agile dog generally used to hunt ducks, rabbits, boar and fowl.  There are three accepted sizes (small, medium and large) and three coat types (wire-haired, long-haired and smooth).

History
As with some other Mediterranean sighthounds, it is sometimes claimed that the Podenco descends from Egyptian hounds such as the Tesem or Saluki, distributed by Phoenician traders in the 1st century BC. However, it was not until 1990 that a breed club formed to promote the development of breed standards. Phillipe Bloque-Rentón and colleagues at the University of Córdoba's veterinary medicine faculty undertook the research work required to specify the breed; their study, presented at the second Simposium de las razas caninas españolas (Spanish dog breeds symposium) in 1992, was recognized by Real Sociedad Canina de España in April of that year as a defining breed standard. In Spain, podenco Andaluz were included within Group V - Spitz and Primitive Types, under Section 7, Primitive type - Hunting dogs. However, the breed is recognized neither by the Fédération Cynologique Internationale (FCI) nor by any other international dog breeds association, due to the large number of matches with the Portuguese Podengo standard — a fact which casts doubt on its claim to be regarded as a separate breed. Genetically the Podenco Andaluz is most closely related to the Galgo Español. In January 2015 it was recognized by the Verband für das Deutsche Hundewesen in Germany.

Characteristics

There are three sizes – large, medium and small – and three types of coat – wire-haired (Spanish: Cerdeño), long-haired (Spanish: Sedeño) and smooth. This combination of factors can results in nine different varieties. This variability may be the result of adaptation to the different microclimates within Andalusia, including mountains, agricultural land and marshes, as well as the diverse game targeted by hunters. Coat colors ranges from white to deep red. Podenco Andaluz have a trot as fast as their gallop. 

Like other warren hounds, the Podenco has excellent sight, hearing and sense of smell. They are renowned for their methodical hunting style, as well as stamina and endurance while working in the mild winters with irregular precipitations, and dry, hot, sunny summers of Andalusia. Podenco Andaluz are lively dogs, affectionate, loyal to their owners, but wary with strangers.

Podenco Andaluz are used either singularly, in pairs or as part of a large hunting pack known as a rehala. Small and medium podenco Andaluz hunt rabbits with one dog entering the bramble to drive out the rabbit, while the rest lie in wait to catch it. medium and smaller dogs search out deer or wild boar, while the larger hounds are used for attacking the prey.

One of the most typical functions of the large Andalusian hound was that of the so-called quitaor accompanying the Spanish greyhound colleras during hare hunting. The quitaor‘s job consisted primarily of flushing out the hares from their home or hiding place and killing them; then, together with the greyhounds, retrieving them for the owner.  Andalusian farmhouses would use the larger hounds as watchdogs, and the smaller hounds were used to kill rodents.

References

Sighthounds
Dog breeds originating in Andalusia